Horns Creek is a  long 2nd order tributary to the Fisher River in Surry County, North Carolina.

Course
Horns Creek rises 0.5 miles south of Stotts Knob.  Horns Creek then flows southeast to join the Fisher River about 0.25 miles west of Turkey Ford, North Carolina.

Watershed
Horns Creek drains  of area, receives about 48.1 in/year of precipitation, has a wetness index of 301.57, and is about 66% forested.

See also
List of rivers of North Carolina

References

Rivers of North Carolina
Rivers of Surry County, North Carolina